Glutamate dehydrogenase pseudogene 5, also known as GLUDP5, is a human gene.

References

Further reading

Pseudogenes